Ecum Secum is a rural community on the Eastern Shore of Nova Scotia, Canada, located in both the Halifax Regional Municipality and Guysborough County. Several communities along the western shore of the harbour also share the name, including Ecum Secum Bridge and Ecum Secum West. The name of the community is derived from the Mi'kmaq language and means "a red house". The first Europeans to settle in the Ecum Secum area were Loyalists during the 1780s.

Climate

References

Communities in Guysborough County, Nova Scotia
Communities in Halifax, Nova Scotia
General Service Areas in Nova Scotia